This list of birds of the Sonoran Desert includes all bird species endemic to the Sonoran Desert, and related areas; (a few species listed are only "native" and have a larger continental range). They are retrieved from the List of birds of Yuma County, Arizona, though not exclusively.

Southwest region
The listed birds are based on the southern section of the Lower Colorado River Valley, from Yuma County and La Paz County, to the Bill Williams River, (and by extension to Needles, California/Topock, Arizona). The Colorado River borders the higher elevation Mojave Desert to the northwest (Needles and Las Vegas), the Colorado Desert–(extension of Sonoran Desert) on the southwest and west, and the deserts of the Sonoran Desert to the east, the Yuma Desert, Lechuguilla Desert, and the Tule Desert.

Bolded species are exclusive to the hottest deserts (southwestern Arizona; Baja California; northern Mexico; and the Carrizo Plain).

 Costa's hummingbird, Calypte costae
 Gambel's quail, Callipepla gambelii
 Black rail, Laterallus jamaicensis
 SW Ariz Sonoran desert, but also other locales.
 Greater roadrunner, Geococcyx californianus, (Extensive range beyond the Sonoran Desert)
 Gila woodpecker, Melanerpes uropygialis
 Gilded flicker, Colaptes chrysoides
 Vermilion flycatcher, Pyrocephalus rubinus
 Brown-crested flycatcher, Myiarchus tyrannulus
 Black-tailed gnatcatcher, Polioptila melanura
 Also ranges E and S into the Chihuahuan Desert, Texas and Mexico.
 Crissal thrasher, Toxostoma crissale, ranges S into Central Mexico
 Curve-billed thrasher, Toxostoma curvirostre
 Le Conte's thrasher, Toxostoma lecontei, Sonoran, and ranges into S Nevada–(locally: the Carrizo Plain, N of Los Angeles)
 Phainopepla, Phainopepla nitens
 Also ranges into California's San Joaquin Valley.
 Lucy's warbler, Oreothlypis luciae
 Exclusive in Sonoran Desert, Summer Range, (includes the Colorado River Valley, the Grand Canyon, and S Nevada).
 Abert's towhee, Melozone aberti, (–Sonoran Desert–)
 Black-throated sparrow, Amphispiza bilineata
Permanent breeding range, (but ranges E to Texas, and also Summer ranges to very S Oregon, very S Idaho).
 Yellow-headed blackbird, Xanthocephalus xanthocephalus
 Permanent in S Lower Colorado River Valley

Southeast region
The southeast Arizona region is defined by: 1–the mountains of eastern Arizona, extending into western and southwestern New Mexico; 2–the sky islands defined by the NW–to–SE trending mountain ranges (formerly of the Basin and Range geology), also called regionally the Madrean sky islands; and 3–the northernmost extension of the western spine mountain range of Mexico, the Sierra Madre Occidental (West). The result is a biome region particular to its: geographic locale, elevation, and proximity to flyways, namely for the mountains (of Mexico, the United States, and to Canada), and for the proximity to the Gulf of California, Gulf of Mexico, and the Pacific Ocean.

See also
 List of birds of Arizona

'birds
Sonoran
Sonoran Desert
Birds